Ambalika Devi (1894–1936) was a Nepalese writer and poet. She is considered as the first Nepalese woman novelist. Her novel Rajput Ramani was published in 1932.

Biography 
She was born on 20 May 1894 (8 Jestha 1951 BS) in Makhan Tole, Kathmandu, Nepal to father Ekkrishna Nepal and mother Ratna Kumari. She came from an affluent family. Her father was a Subba (officer) in Rana government. Her maternal grandmother, Dev Kumari Koirala was the wet-nurse to King Prithvi Bir Bikram Shah. She was called Putali in her childhood. 

After she married Ambika Prasad Upadhyaya at the age of 7, her name was changed to Ambalika Devi, according to the prevalent custom. She moved to her in-law's in Patna. She was educated in home by tutors. She received education in English-medium.

In 1932, she published Rajput Ramani. The book was completed on 1 May 1932 (19 Baisakh 1989 BS) and published in September 1932 by General Trading Company, Varanasi. It is th first novel written in Nepali language by a woman writer.

Personal life and death 
In 1901 at the age of 7, she married historian Ambika Prasad Upadhyaya. They had no children of their own, so they decided to adopt Rajeshwor Prasad, the son of Sharada Prasad Upadhyaya, the younger brother of Ambika Prasad Upadhyaya as dharmaputra (a a spiritual son). The adoption was performed according to Hindu rituals. Devi died on 15 December 1936 (1 Poush 1993 BS) in Patna.

Works 

 Rajput Ramani (1932)

References

Further reading 

 

1894 births
1936 deaths
20th-century Nepalese women writers
20th-century Nepalese writers
Nepalese Hindus
Nepalese women poets